Hell Ride is a 2008 American action/neo-outlaw biker film written and directed by Larry Bishop and starring Bishop, Michael Madsen, Dennis Hopper, Eric Balfour, Vinnie Jones, Leonor Varela and David Carradine. It was released under the "Quentin Tarantino Presents" banner. The film is an homage to the original outlaw biker films of the 1960s and 1970s.

Plot 
Biker Pistolero (Larry Bishop) is the leader, or "Prez," of the Victors, a Southern California motorcycle gang.  He has two faithful lieutenants, The Gent (Michael Madsen) and the young Comanche (Eric Balfour).

In 1976, Cherokee Kisum (Julia Jones), the girlfriend of Pistolero (then known as Johnny) is viciously murdered by The Deuce (David Carradine) and Billy Wings (Vinnie Jones), leaders of the arch-rival gang the Six-Six-Six'ers, as a message to the Victors. The Deuce later moves into large scale business efforts, leaving the biker life behind and the Sixers dry up as a gang.  Cherokee has also hidden away a small fortune from under-the-table drug deals she made behind the Deuce's back - another reason behind her murder.  The stash of money is intended for her young son, who disappears after her death.

Years later, after The Deuce returns to the area to close up unfinished business and Billy Wings reforms the Sixers in Los Angeles, the rival gang infiltrates the Victors in an attempt to take over their territory. One member from 1976, St. Louie, is murdered in the same manner as Cherokee Kisum.  Bob the Bum, the Victors' treasurer, is similarly killed.  Pistolero then begins to make moves to eliminate the Sixers and finally gain his revenge. While loyal bikers are killed by the Sixers, the more treacherous and less faithful Victors try to influence The Gent, Comanche, and Goody Two-Shoes to switch sides - or kill them. Goody Two-Shoes is eventually killed after being located and chased down by Billy Wings.

With the aid of his beautiful & mysterious "medicine woman" Nada (Leonor Varela) and his old friend and ally Eddie Zero (Dennis Hopper), Pistolero and the remaining Victors try to locate and kill The Deuce, Billy Wings and the Sixers before they themselves are killed.

Cast 
 Larry Bishop as Johnny "Pistolero", The Victors M.C.
 Michael Madsen as "The Gent", The Victors M.C. 
 Dennis Hopper as Eddie "Zero" / Scratch, The Victors M.C.
 Eric Balfour as Sonny "Comanche" Kisum / Bix, The Victors M.C.
Austin Galuppo as Young Sonny Kisum
 Vinnie Jones as Billy "Wings", The 666ers M.C.
 Leonor Varela as Nada
 Michael Beach as "Goody Two-Shoes", The Victors M.C.
 Laura Cayouette as Dani
 Julia Jones as "Cherokee" Kisum
 Francesco Quinn as "Machete"
 Cristos as "Speed"
 Allison McAtee as "The Swede"
 Cassandra Hepburn as Maria
 David Carradine as "The Deuce", The 666ers M.C.
 Pete Randall as Louie "St. Louie", The Victors M.C.
 Dean Delray as "Ape-Shit", The Victors M.C.
 Lee Alfred as "Joint", The Victors M.C.
 David Grieco as "Dr. Cement", The Victors M.C.
 Kanin Howell as "Opium"
 Michael Macecsko as "Shyster"
 Terry Fradet as "Holy Smoke"
 Steve McCammon as Bob "The Bum"
 Theresa Alexandria as Carmen
 Andrea Fellers as "Echo"
 Alyson Sullivan as Gigi
 Tracy Phillips as Yvonne
 Maja Mandzuka as Danka
 Amber Hay as "Flower" (uncredited) 
 Claudia Salinas as Angelina (uncredited)
 Natasha Yi as Jucinda (uncredited)
 Diana Prince as Topless Waitress (uncredited)

Production notes 
Larry Bishop's character Pistolero is named after the original title for Robert Rodriguez’s Desperado. The dialogue spoken by the character Nada (Leonor Varela) is made up almost entirely of double entendres and clichés.

Bishop took extra duties on this film by not only starring in it, but also writing, directing and co-producing with producers Michael Steinberg and Shana Stein, and executive producer Quentin Tarantino. This film is Bishop's modern-day take on those 1960s motorcycle flicks he used to turn out for B-movie masters American International Pictures. It is the project Tarantino inspired Bishop to begin some five and a half years ago, when he told Bishop: "It is your destiny to write, direct and star in a movie". Tarantino also assured Bishop that he would help to produce his film.

Release 
Hell Ride premiered at the 2008 Sundance Film Festival. It had a brief theatrical run via Third Rail Releasing before being released to DVD worldwide.

References

External links 
 
 
 Hell Ride at Biker Cinema
 
 

2008 films
2008 action films
American action films
American nonlinear narrative films
Outlaw biker films
American films about revenge
Dimension Films films
Films directed by Larry Bishop
2000s English-language films
2000s American films